Sonia Edwards is a Welsh poet and writer who writes primarily in Welsh. She is a recipient of the Tir na n-Og Award.

Life
Edwards was born in Cemaes on the island of Anglesey. She is known as a writer of books in Welsh although she also translates her own books into English. She won the Arts Council Book of the Year Award in 1996. In 1999 she won the Prose Medal at the National Eisteddfod  on Anglesey. In 2017 she won it again at the Anglesey Eisteddfod.

She taught Welsh at Ysgol Gyfun Llangefni, a school in Llangefni on the same island  where she was born. She retired from teaching to pursue a career in writing.

Works
Nofelau Nawr: Cadwyn O Flodau, 2000
White Tree, 2001
A White Veil for Tomorrow, 2003
Swigod: Jelygaid, 2012
Rhannu Ymbarèl, 2017

References

Living people
People from Anglesey
British women poets
Welsh-language writers
Year of birth missing (living people)